Park So-hyun (born 2 July 2002) is a South Korean tennis player. 

Park has a career-high WTA singles ranking of 295, achieved on 18 July 2022. On the ITF Junior Circuit, she has a career-high combined ranking of 17, reached on 14 October 2019.

Park made her WTA Tour main-draw debut at the 2018 Korea Open, after being handed a wildcard into the singles tournament.

ITF Circuit finals

Singles: 7 (3 titles, 4 runner-ups)

Doubles: 7 (2 titles, 5 runner–ups)

References

External links
 
 

2002 births
Living people
South Korean female tennis players
21st-century South Korean women